Schlecker was a German retail company with headquarters in Ehingen which once had a workforce of some 52,000. There were stores across Europe including Germany, Austria, the Czech Republic, Luxembourg, Portugal, Poland, France, Spain and Italy. Schlecker announced the closure of half its shops across Germany with effect from 29 February 2012. Due to bankruptcy, the remaining stores were closed on 27 June of that year,  with the exception of the 'XL' markets and the businesses of associated 'Ihr Platz' brand.

History 

When Anton Schlecker joined the company in 1965, Schlecker was a butchery chain with 17 subsidiaries. He founded a department store, Schleckerland, in the same year. Between 1972 and 1976, another four department stores were opened in Schwäbisch Gmünd, Geislingen, Neu-Ulm and Göppingen. With the abolition of resale price maintenance on cosmetics, healthcare and household products in 1974, Anton Schlecker established his first store for these items the following year. In 1987, the company's first foreign subsidiary  was established in Austria. In 1991 the company acquired Superdrug in France and, shortly thereafter, established subsidiary companies in the Netherlands and Spain. In 1999, Schlecker entered the Italian market. The first markets in Poland and Portugal opened in 2004 and 2006, respectively.

Bankruptcy and dissolution 
On 21 January 2011, it was announced that Thorben Rusch would become Schlecker's new COO, with Sami Sagur taking the post of CFO.

Schlecker filed for bankruptcy on 23 January 2012 although it was announced that business would continue during the bankruptcy process. 104 markets of the Ihr Platz subsidiary were taken over by Schlecker's competitor Rossmann.

Literature 
 Sarah Bormann: Angriff auf die Mitbestimmung. Unternehmensstrategien gegen Betriebsräte – der Fall Schlecker. Edition Sigma, Berlin 2007, .
 Michael Opoczynski: Die Blutsauger der Nation - Wie ein entfesselter Kapitalismus uns ruiniert. Droemer, .
 Rüdiger Liedtke: Wem gehört die Republik? Die Konzerne und ihre Verflechtungen in der globalisierten Wirtschaft 2007. Namen Zahlen Fakten. Eichborn Verlags AG, Frankfurt a. M. 2006, S. 375-377.

References 

Companies based in Baden-Württemberg
Retail companies established in 1975
Retail companies disestablished in 2012
1975 establishments in West Germany
2012 disestablishments in Germany